Zbigniew Gorzelańczyk (31 July 1944 – 6 February 1996) was a Polish politician, and Sejm deputy for two terms until his death in 1996.

Gorzelańczyk graduated from the Academy of Physical Education in Wroclaw in 1968, and the Political University in Moscow  in 1983. He was elected twice in the Leszno-Zielona Góra and Leszno districts of the Democratic Left Alliance.

Gorzelańczyk along with parliament member Marek Wielgus were killed in the 1996 crash of Birgenair Flight 301 in the Dominican Republic.

He was posthumously awarded the following:

 Knight's Cross of the Order of Polonia Restituta.

References

Bibliography 
 Strona sejmowa posła II kadencji

1996 deaths
1944 births
Democratic Left Alliance politicians
Victims of aviation accidents or incidents in the Dominican Republic
Victims of aviation accidents or incidents in 1996
People from Leszno
Knights of the Order of Polonia Restituta